Five Years may refer to:

Music

Albums

 Five Years (1969–1973), a 2015 compilation album by David Bowie
 Five Years: Singles, a 2001 compilation album by Takako Matsu
 5 Years (Kaela Kimura album), 2010
 Five Years Later, a 1981 album by guitarists John Abercrombie and Ralph Towner

Songs
 "Five Years" (David Bowie song), a song by David Bowie from the 1971 album Ziggy Stardust 
 "5 Years" (Björk song), a song by Björk from the 1997 album Homogenic
 "Five Years", a song by Bo Burnham from the 2022 album The Inside Outtakes

Other 

 Five Years (book), a 1966 autobiographical collection of American social critic Paul Goodman's notebooks
 The Last Five Years, a musical by Jason Robert Brown, premiered in 2001
 Five Years (Graphic Novel), a 2019 series by Terry Moore

See also

 "Five Long Years", a 1952 song by blues vocalist/pianist Eddie Boyd
 
 Five-year plan (disambiguation)
 Lustrum, a term for a five-year period in Ancient Rome. 

Units of time